Nacoleiopsis is a genus of moths of the family Crambidae. It contains only one species, Nacoleiopsis auriceps, which is found in Sakhalin.

References

Natural History Museum Lepidoptera genus database

Pyraustinae
Crambidae genera
Taxa named by Shōnen Matsumura